The 2012–13 Missouri Mavericks season is the fourth season of the Central Hockey League (CHL) franchise in Independence, Missouri, a suburb of Kansas City, Missouri.

Off-season
On May 24, 2012, the Mavericks extended Head Coach Scott Hillman's contract for two additional seasons through the 2013–14 season.

On July 31, 2012, the Mavericks announced an agreement with Entercom to have all 66 games for the 2012-13 season broadcast on radio on 1660 KUDL.

On September 8, 2012, the Mavericks announced the renewal of their affiliation agreement with the Chicago Wolves of the American Hockey League for the 2012–13 season.

On October 19, 2012, the day of the Mavericks' first Regular Season game against the Denver Cutthroats, the team announced Sebastien Thinel as the team's Captain and Ryan Jardine, Dave Pszenyczny, and David Simoes as Alternate Captains.

Regular season

On March 17, 2013, with a 3–1 win over the Quad City Mallards, the Mavericks clinched their fourth consecutive berth in the 2013 Central Hockey League Ray Miron President's Cup Playoffs.  It was announced on March 24, 2013, that the Mavericks clinched the 5th seed and would play the 4th-seeded Rapid City Rush in the first round of the playoffs.

Playoffs
On April 23, 2013, the Mavericks' 2012–13 season ended with a 7–3 loss to the Allen Americans on the road in Allen, Texas in Game 7 of the Ray Miron President's Cup Playoffs Semifinals.

Awards, Records, and Milestones

Awards and Records

Transactions

Player Signings/Acquisitions off Waivers/Activated from League Suspension

Free Agency Losses/Waivings/Player Retirements/Placements on Team Suspension/Suspended by League

Trades

Player Transfers to/from Affiliate Team or On Loan from Non-Affiliate Team

Roster
Source:

See also
 2012–13 CHL season

References

External links
 Missouri Mavericks Official Website 
 2012-13 Missouri Mavericks Regular Season on CentralHockeyLeague.com
 2012–13 Missouri Mavericks season at EliteProspects.com

Missouri Mavericks seasons
Missouri
Missouri
2013 in sports in Missouri
2012 in sports in Missouri